St. James Anglican Church, in Kerikeri, New Zealand, is a congregation of the Anglican Church in Aotearoa in the Diocese of Auckland, currently operated as a mission of St. Paul's Church, Whangaroa. It is noted for its historic church building, which was built in 1878.

History 
The first chapel was started in November 1823 and opened some 6 months later, but this was not built on the site of the present church. The second chapel, which was started some time early in 1829, was by tradition built on the site chosen by the redoubtable Hongi Hika, then the paramount chief of the Ngāpuhi. When the Mission Station was disbanded in 1848 this chapel fell into disrepair with the result that a new church was built on the same site in 1878. An extract form the Church Gazette reads: "A remarkable neat little church was opened at Kerikeri on December 5th 1878. The services were conducted by Archdeacon Clarke and the Rev H P Tua." The entire cost of the building was two hundred and thirty five pounds: a small debt of ten pounds was all that was owed.

The building was made of Kauri weather boards (boards and battens) and a shingle roof, and foundations of puriri piles on stone blocks. William Cook and Son of Waimate North, who had built the church of St. John the Baptist in 1871, were also the builders of St James.

Dedication
The church is dedicated to St James the Greater of Compostela. Tradition has it that after his martyrdom in AD 42, the body of St James was placed in a boat without sail or rudder which drifted onto the Spanish coast. His shrine at Compostela became a famous place of pilgrimage and still is today.

References

External links
Official website
New Zealand Heritage

Anglican churches in New Zealand
Churches completed in 1878
19th-century Anglican church buildings
Far North District
Bay of Islands
1870s architecture in New Zealand
Religious organizations established in 1823
Religious buildings and structures in the Northland Region